Michael J. Neufeld is a historian and author. He chaired the Space History Division at the Smithsonian’s National Air and Space Museum from 2007 to 2011, and continues to be a curator there.

Biography
Neufeld was born in Edmonton, Alberta, in 1951. He received a bachelor's degree from the University of Calgary and an M.A. from the University of British Columbia in 1976 with a thesis entitled "He who will not work, neither shall he eat: German social democratic attitudes to labor, 1890-1914". He received his Ph.D. from Johns Hopkins University in 1984 with a dissertation on "From artisans to workers: the transformation of the skilled metalworkers of Nuremberg, 1835-1905".

Since the 1990s, Neufeld has written several works about Wernher von Braun. His work has been criticized as non-scientific.

Books

Books written
The Skilled Metalworkers of Nuremberg: Craft and Class in the Industrial Revolution. New Brunswick: Rutgers University Press, 1989.
The Rocket and the Reich: Peenemünde and the Coming of the Ballistic Missile Era. New York: Free Press, 1995. The book won the American Institute of Aeronautics and Astronautics's History Manuscript Award, and the Society for the History of Technology's Dexter Prize.
Translated into German by Jens Wagner as Die Rakete und das Reich: Wernher von Braun, Peenemünde und der Beginn des Raketenzeitalters. 
Review by Kees Gispen, Central European History. 31, no. 4, (1998): 474.
Von Braun: Dreamer of Space, Engineer of War. New York: A.A. Knopf, 2007. The book won the Organization of American Historians's Leopold Prize, and the American Astronautical Society's Eugene M. Emme Award for Astronautical Literature. 
Translated into German as Wernher von Braun: Visionär des Weltraums, Ingenieur des Krieges.
Translated into Danish as Wernher von Braun: krigsingeniør og rumfartsvisionær.
Translated into Polish as Von Braun: [inżynier nazistów i Amerykanów].

Books edited
with Yves Béon. (eds.) Planet Dora: a memoir of the Holocaust and the birth of the space age. Boulder, Colorado: WestviewPress, 1997.
with Michael Berenbaum. (eds.) The Bombing of Auschwitz: Should the Allies Have Attempted It? New York: St. Martin's Press, 2000. 
Review by Edward L. Homze. The Journal of Military History. 65, no. 3, (2001): 846.
Review by Willard Allen Fletcher. Holocaust and Genocide Studies. 15, no. 3, (2001): 503.
with Alex M. Spencer. (eds.) Smithsonian National Air and Space Museum: An Autobiography. Washington, D.C: National Geographic Society, 2010.
Spacefarers: Images of Astronauts and Cosmonauts in the Heroic Era of Spaceflight. Washington, D.C.: Smithsonian Institution Scholarly Press, 2013.
Milestones of Space: Eleven Iconic Objects from the Smithsonian National Air and Space Museum. Minneapolis, Minnesota: Smithsonian National Air and Space Museum in association with Zenith Press, 2014.

References 

1951 births
20th-century Canadian historians
Canadian male non-fiction writers
Writers from Edmonton
University of Calgary alumni
University of British Columbia alumni
Johns Hopkins University alumni
Smithsonian Institution people
Living people
Canadian Mennonites
Mennonite writers
21st-century Canadian historians